Samuel Livermore (May 14, 1732May 18, 1803) was a U.S. politician. He was a U.S. Senator from New Hampshire from 1793 to 1801 and served as President pro tempore of the United States Senate in 1796 and again in 1799.

Life and career
Livermore was born in Waltham in the Province of Massachusetts Bay, the son of Hannah (Brown) and Samuel Livermore, and attended Waltham schools. He graduated from the College of New Jersey (now Princeton University) in 1752, then studied law, was admitted to the bar in 1756, and commenced practice in Waltham. He moved to Portsmouth, in 1758 and later to Londonderry. He was a member of the New Hampshire General Court (the state's general assembly) 1768–1769. He was judge-advocate in the Admiralty court and Attorney General from 1769 to 1774. He moved to Holderness in 1775 and was State attorney for three years.

Livermore was a Member of the Continental Congress from 1780 to 1782 and again from 1785 to 1786. He was chief justice of the New Hampshire Superior Court of Judicature from 1782 to 1789, and a member of the State constitutional convention in 1788. He was elected to the United States House of Representatives for the First and Second Congresses, serving from March 4, 1789, to March 4, 1793. He was chairman of the House Committee on Elections in the Second Congress.

Livermore was president of the State constitutional convention in 1791 and in 1792 was elected as a Federalist to the United States Senate and was reelected in 1798 and served from March 4, 1793, until his resignation effective June 12, 1801, due to ill health. He served as President pro tempore of the Senate during the Fourth and Sixth Congresses. The defunct town of Livermore, New Hampshire was named after him.

Livermore died in Holderness, New Hampshire, and is interred in Trinity Churchyard there. He is featured on a New Hampshire historical marker (number 39) along New Hampshire Route 175 in Holderness.

Livermore was the father of Arthur Livermore, a U.S. Representative from New Hampshire, and Edward St. Loe Livermore, a U.S. Representative from Massachusetts.

References

External links

 

1732 births
1803 deaths
Politicians from Waltham, Massachusetts
People of colonial Massachusetts
American people of English descent
Continental Congressmen from New Hampshire
Anti-Administration Party members of the United States House of Representatives from New Hampshire
Pro-Administration Party members of the United States House of Representatives from New Hampshire
Pro-Administration Party United States senators from New Hampshire
Federalist Party United States senators from New Hampshire
New Hampshire Federalists
Presidents pro tempore of the United States Senate
Chief Justices of the New Hampshire Supreme Court
18th-century American judges
People from Holderness, New Hampshire
18th-century American lawyers
Princeton University alumni
19th-century American Episcopalians
Members of the United States House of Representatives from New Hampshire